Fairwater railway station is a railway station serving the Fairwater area of Cardiff, Wales. Passenger services are currently operated by Transport for Wales.

The station was opened in 1987 when a passenger service was introduced to the City Line. The line on which it is situated on was originally goods only and was opened by the Taff Vale Railway in 1859 to serve the docks at Penarth.

Services
On Monday to Saturdays, two trains per hour in each direction serve Fairwater. There is no Sunday service. The station is unmanned.

See also
 List of railway stations in Cardiff
 Rail transport in Cardiff

References

External links

Railway stations in Cardiff
DfT Category F2 stations
Railway stations opened by British Rail
Railway stations in Great Britain opened in 1987
Railway stations served by Transport for Wales Rail